The 1979–80 Sheffield Shield season was the 78th season of the Sheffield Shield, the domestic first-class cricket competition of Australia. Victoria won the championship.

Table

Statistics

Most Runs
Ian Chappell 713

Most Wickets
Ashley Mallett 45

References

Sheffield Shield
Sheffield Shield
Sheffield Shield seasons